Year 1006 (MVI) was a common year starting on Tuesday (link will display the full calendar) of the Julian calendar.

Events

By place

Europe 
 Summer – An Arab Saracen fleet appears before Pisa, but departs again. The Pisans take their fleet to sea and chase the Arabs down to Southern Italy where, in the Battle of Reggio  Calabria, the Pisan fleet defeats the Arabs.
 Summer–Autumn – Danish Viking raiders led by Sweyn Forkbeard raid south-eastern England from the Isle of Wight to Reading in the Thames Valley where they overwinter at the Wallingford river crossing.
 Brian Boru visits Ulster, and remains unchallenged.

Oceania 
 A major eruption of the Mount Merapi volcano on Java causes devastation throughout the centre of the island (which it covers with volcanic ash) and to the Javanese Hindu Mataram Kingdom.

By topic

Astronomy 
 April 30 – The brightest supernova ever recorded, SN 1006, occurs in the constellation of Lupus. It is observed and described in China, Japan, Iraq, Egypt, and Europe and possibly depicted in North American rock art. Modern astronomers now consider its distance at about 7,200 light-years. The supernova provides enough light to read by on a night with a dark moon.

Births 
 October 23 – Wen Yanbo, grand chancellor (d. 1097)
 Al-Lakhmi, Fatimid scholar and jurist (d. 1085)
 Constantine X, Byzantine emperor (d. 1067)
 Ísleifur Gissurarson, Icelandic bishop (d. 1080)
 Khwaja Abdullah Ansari, Persian Sufi poet (d. 1088)

Deaths 
 February 13 – Fulcran, bishop of Lodève (France)
 July 21 – Gisela of Burgundy, duchess of Bavaria
 December 26 – Gao Qiong, Chinese general (b. 935)
 Ælfhelm of York, ealdorman (dux) of Northumbria
 Azon the Venerable (or Atso), French prelate
 Fiachra Ua Focarta, abbot of Clonfert (Ireland)
 Giovanni Orseolo, Venetian nobleman (b. 981)
 Ibn Marzuban, Persian official and physician
 Maud of Normandy, French noblewoman 
 Olaf the Peacock, Icelandic merchant
 Sherira Gaon, Jewish spiritual leader
 Cenwulf, bishop of Winchester (approximate date)

References